Asterostomella is a genus of fungi in the Asterinaceae family. The relationship of this taxon to other taxa within the class is unknown (incertae sedis), and it has not yet been placed with certainty into any order. They are leaf parasites. Such as Asterostomella miliusae is found on Miliusa tomentosa  plants in India as a type of 'black mildew'.

It is found in South America (including Brazil and Argentina), Africa and parts of Asia. Including the Philippine Islands.

Description
The coelomycetous genus is characterised by brown, ovoid, aseptate pycnidia (fruiting body), sometimes with a non-pigmented band in the middle. The genus is considered as a member of Asterinaceae based on its scutellate (shaped like a shield or platter), or orbicular, conidiomata (blister fruiting body) with stellate dehiscence, which is similar to Asterina.

After Speg. had formed the genus in 1886. Several later authors added new species to Asterostomella including (Petrak and Ciferri 1932; Doidge 1942; Viégas 1945; Batista and Ciferri 1959; Rao and Anahosur 1972; Singh et al. 1982; Hosagouder and Goos 1994; Hosagouder et al. 2007; Hosagouder et al. 2014; Sabeena et al. 2018). Recognising different species in Asterostomella has been done based on fruiting body diameter and conidial sizes (Reynolds and Gilbert 2005).

Species
As accepted by Species Fungorum;

 Asterostomella aberiae 
 Asterostomella acalyphae 
 Asterostomella africana 
 Asterostomella alangii 
 Asterostomella alchorneae 
 Asterostomella anogeissi 
 Asterostomella australis 
 Asterostomella balanseana 
 Asterostomella baliospermi 
 Asterostomella banisteriae 
 Asterostomella boehmeriae 
 Asterostomella caperoniae 
 Asterostomella capparis 
 Asterostomella caricae 
 Asterostomella celasteri 
 Asterostomella ceropegiae 
 Asterostomella combreti 
 Asterostomella concinna 
 Asterostomella cupaniae 
 Asterostomella daphniphylli 
 Asterostomella derridicola 
 Asterostomella dhanikariensis 
 Asterostomella dilleniicola 
 Asterostomella diplocarpa 
 Asterostomella dispar 
 Asterostomella dorsteniae 
 Asterostomella elaeocarpi-serrati 
 Asterostomella epiphylla 
 Asterostomella erysiphoides 
 Asterostomella eugeniicola 
 Asterostomella excoecariicola 
 Asterostomella farrargunjensis 
 Asterostomella flacourtiae-montanae 
 Asterostomella flacourtiarum 
 Asterostomella forsteroniae 
 Asterostomella gregariella 
 Asterostomella grewiae 
 Asterostomella hamatula 
 Asterostomella helicteris 
 Asterostomella heteropteridis 
 Asterostomella horrida 
 Asterostomella indecora 
 Asterostomella indica 
 Asterostomella isonandrae 
 Asterostomella isothea 
 Asterostomella kushinagarensis 
 Asterostomella kutuensis 
 Asterostomella lauracearum 
 Asterostomella ligustri 
 Asterostomella lismorensis 
 Asterostomella lunaniae 
 Asterostomella maculosa 
 Asterostomella meliosmae 
 Asterostomella meliosmicola 
 Asterostomella meliosmigena 
 Asterostomella micheliae 
 Asterostomella miliusae 
 Asterostomella minuta 
 Asterostomella ornata 
 Asterostomella orthosticha 
 Asterostomella otonephelii 
 Asterostomella paraguayensis 
 Asterostomella parameriae 
 Asterostomella pelladensis 
 Asterostomella polystigma 
 Asterostomella pongamiae 
 Asterostomella pseudospondiadis 
 Asterostomella radermacherae 
 Asterostomella rhaphiostylidis 
 Asterostomella roureae 
 Asterostomella scolopiae-crenatae 
 Asterostomella shoreae 
 Asterostomella splendida 
 Asterostomella stipitipodia 
 Asterostomella strombosiae 
 Asterostomella strophanthi 
 Asterostomella terminaliae 
 Asterostomella tonduzii 
 Asterostomella tosaensis 
 Asterostomella trematis 
 Asterostomella ubatubensis 
 Asterostomella vernoniae 
 Asterostomella visci 
 Asterostomella vismiae 
 Asterostomella walleniae 
 Asterostomella xylosmae 
 Asterostomella ziziphina 

Former species;
 A. cristata  = Asterina solanicola Asterinaceae
 A. epiphylla var. gallica  = Asterostomella epiphylla
 A. lepianthis  = Asterina lepianthis
 A. meliosmae  = Asterostomella tosaensis
 A. meliosmicola  = Asterostomella meliosmigena
 A. veronicae  = Asterina veronicae

References

External links
Index Fungorum

Asterinaceae